Rhys Davies (born 8 February 1998) is a Welsh rugby union player who plays for Cardiff Blues as a fly-half. He is a Wales Sevens international.

Davies has yet to debut for the Cardiff Blues regional team but has previously played for the Blues academy.

References

External links
Cardiff Blues profile

1998 births
Living people
Cardiff Rugby players
Rugby union players from Cardiff
Welsh rugby union players
Rugby union fly-halves